Sihler is a surname deriving originally from Germany. Highest numbers of Sihler’s are in the United States. 

Notable people with the surname include:

Andrew Sihler (born 1941), an American linguist and comparative Indo-Europeanist
Ernest Gottlieb Sihler  (1853–1942), a professor of classics at Johns Hopkins University
Wilhelm Sihler (1801–1885), a German Lutheran minister
William W. Sihler (born 1937), professor of business administration at the University of Virginia